Soar Automotive (officially Qingdao SOAR Automotive Group, Ltd.) is a Chinese motor vehicle manufacturing company headquartered in Qingdao. It is specialized in coach building bespoke vehicles including ambulances, police cars, funeral hearses, limousines, courtesy buses and special military vehicles.

Soar was formed in 1991 through the merger of a number of Qingdao-based automotive companies and has produced automobiles since 2001.

Operations
The Soar corporate campus in Qingdao includes 40,000 square meters of buildings. Around 80 engineers and 180 other professional staff are based at the site.

Products

Soar's products include specialised military vehicles, patient transport vehicles, funeral hearses, bespoke luxury cars, exhibition vehicles and other vehicles for special use.

Soar's early vehicles included the Saint Horse, an open-top fire-fighting vehicle in a 1920s retro style, and a courtesy bus produced under license from Asquith Mascot Courtesy Bus. Based on the Ford Transit chassis, the third model was the idiosyncratic Shengma camper van.

Since late 2008, Soar has produced a reinterpretation of the Rolls-Royce Phantom V, based on the platform of the Brilliance BS6. It is powered by a Mitsubishi 2.4 litre four-cylinder engine which generates 100 kW and 200 nm.

In addition, Soar produces a retro-style funeral hearse based on the platform of the Brilliance BS4, and a luxury car also based on the BS4 named SOAR 1 single.

References

Further reading

External links
Official Website (Chinese)

Car manufacturers of China
Bus manufacturers of China
Luxury motor vehicle manufacturers
Manufacturing companies based in Qingdao
Vehicle manufacturing companies established in 1991
Chinese brands